Bouvardia ternifolia, the firecracker bush, is a shrub widespread across much of Mexico, the range extending south into Honduras and north into the southwestern United States (Arizona, New Mexico and Texas).

Bouvardia ternifolia is a shrub up to 120 cm (4 feet) tall. It has dark green, narrowly egg-shaped leaves. Flowers are speculacular: long, tubular, bright scarlet, up to 10 cm (2 inches) long, in clusters at the ends of the branches. Hummingbirds frequently imbibe the nectar from the blooms.

Bouvardia ternifolia is widely cultivated as an ornamental because of its showy flowers.

References

External links
 photo of herbarium specimen at Missouri Botanical Garden, collected in Nuevo León in 1983
 photo of herbarium specimen at Missouri Botanical Garden, collected in Nuevo León in 1846

Spermacoceae
Flora of Mexico
Flora of Arizona
Flora of New Mexico
Flora of Texas
Flora of Honduras
Plants described in 1854
Taxa named by Antonio José Cavanilles